Barak Sultan (Baraq Sūltan; 1731–1750) was a descendant of Genghis Khan and a member of the last House of Genghis Khan in the Kazakh Khanate (1221-1847). He was Sultan of the Middle Juz. He is a son of Tursun Khan and great grandfather of Alikhan Bukeikhanov. Barak Sultan was notable for having murdered his rival beheading the first Kazakh Khan in Kazakh history who took citizenship of Russia - Khan of Junior Juz Abulkhair Khan. It was revenge for Abulkhair Khan's pro-Russian policy and the last point was the alleged robbery of a caravan laden with gifts from Barak Sultan to the ruler of the Khanate of Khiva during attacks by Abulkhair Khan against the Karakalpaks, who were also under Barak Sultan's rule. One of his wives was a daughter of Galdan Tseren. During that marriage and until the death of Galdan Tseren in 1745 the war and conflicts between Kazakh Khanate and Dzhungaria had been stopped. As a descendant of Genghis Khan Barak wanted to become the ruler of two Turkic-Mongol states - Dzhungaria and Kazakh Khanate. Barak Sultan and his eldest son had been poisoned by a pro-Russian agent from Middle Juz in 1750. The death of Barak Sultan opened opportunities to expand Russian Empire over the Kazakh Steppe.

References

https://books.google.com/books?id=BbRsMq03dh0C&pg=PA45&lpg=PA45&dq=barak+sultan&source=bl&ots=MQqmazwEGL&sig=gdut03JOhbqo2M9xFKeur3TMGSM&hl=en&sa=X&ved=0ahUKEwjztqL12cHLAhWBZiYKHYXHBp4Q6AEIMTAF#v=onepage&q=barak%20sultan&f=false

1731 births
1750 deaths
Kazakhs Sultans